This is a list of actresses and models who have appeared on the cover of the Australian edition of Marie Claire.

2010

2011

2012

2013

2014

2015

2016

2017

2018

2019

References

Lists of models
Lists of people by magazine appearance